The intercity transportation system in Visalia serves as a regional hub for passenger and freight traffic in the Sequoia Valley, composed of freeways, roads, and bus lines.

Air transportation
In the Visalia metropolitan area there is one commercial airport and many general-aviation airports.

The primary Visalia airport is Visalia Municipal Airport.

Other nearby commercial airports include: Fresno Yosemite International Airport (serves the San Joaquin Valley) and Meadows Field Airport (serves the South Valley).

Some general-aviation airports include: Sequoia Field, Exeter Airport, Woodlake Airport, Porterville Municipal Airport, and Mefford Field.

Land transportation
The City of Visalia is served by a network of freeways, streets, and local and regional public transportation systems.

Freeways 
Freeways of Visalia include:

 Golden State Highway
 Sequoia Freeway

Highways of Visalia include:

 South Mooney Boulevard and Dinuba Boulevard
 Lovers Lane

Public transportation 
Visalia Transit
Tulare County Area Transit (TCaT)
Tulare Intermodal Express (TIME)- Route 11X - Daily service between the downtowns of Tulare and Visalia in partnership with both cities.
Kings Area Regional Transit (KART) - Route 15 - Weekly service between the city of Hanford and Downtown Visalia.
Sequoia Shuttle - Summer service between Visalia and Sequoia National Park.

References

Transportation in Visalia, California
San Joaquin Valley
Transportation in Tulare County, California